Nicolai  Kielstrup (born 4 October 1991) is a Danish singer who participated in the Junior Eurovision Song Contest 2005.

Kielstrup was born in Vejle, Jutland. In 2003, he was present at the Junior Eurovision Song Contest in Copenhagen, as he knew one of the participants.

In 2004, he wrote "Shake, Shake, Shake", a rap song about a nervous boy who falls in love after meeting a girl on the bus on a school field trip to a pond. He performed it at the MGP Junior 2005 scoring maximum points. His resulting participation in Junior Eurovision 2005 earned him a fourth-place finish.

Personal life
Nicolai has a little sister, Natalie, who competed in MGP, but she didn't advance to Melodi Grand Prix Nordic.

Discography

Albums
He has released two albums, 'Nicolai' (2006) and 'Stage 2' (2007)

His third album 'Deja Vu - Tilbage til Mig' was released on 2 February 2009.

External links 
 Nicolai Kielstrup
 MySpace
 Nicolai at kids'music
 The Boy Choir & Soloist Directory

References 

1991 births
Danish child singers
Living people
Danish rappers
Danish  male singer-songwriters
People from Vejle Municipality
21st-century Danish male  singers
Junior Eurovision Song Contest entrants